The Orange Bowl is an annual college football bowl game. 

Orange Bowl may also refer to:

 Miami Orange Bowl, a demolished stadium formerly in Miami, Florida
 One of two tennis tournaments, one for juniors and the other for youth
 Orange Bowl (tennis), an ITF Grade A, USTA Level 1 junior tennis tournament, held in Key Biscayne, Florida, with '18 and under' (under-19) and '16 and under' (under-17) age group categories
 Junior Orange Bowl (tennis), a youth tennis tournament, held in Coral Gables, Florida, for '14 and under' and '12 and under' age groups
 Junior Orange Bowl, non-profit organization